Christophe Andanson (born 12 July 1957) is a French wrestler. He competed in two events at the 1980 Summer Olympics.

References

External links

1957 births
Living people
French male sport wrestlers
Olympic wrestlers of France
Wrestlers at the 1980 Summer Olympics
Place of birth missing (living people)